Louis Vogel (born 1954) is a French jurist, professor and politician. He was President of Panthéon-Assas University from 2006 to 2012 and president of the Conférence des Présidents d'Université. He is the director of the Paris Institute of Comparative Law. In April 2016, he became the mayor of Melun.

He has studied at Paris Institute of Political Studies, Yale Law School, and Panthéon-Assas.

Works
L'Université, une chance pour la France (2010)

References

1954 births
Living people
People from Saarbrücken
Agir (France) politicians
Mayors of places in Île-de-France
French jurists
French people of German descent
Sciences Po alumni
Paris 2 Panthéon-Assas University alumni
Yale Law School alumni
Presidents of Panthéon-Assas University
Academic staff of Paris 2 Panthéon-Assas University